This article lists the official squads for the 1994 Women's Rugby World Cup in Scotland (originally scheduled to be held in the Netherlands).

Pool A

United States
Coach: Franck Boivert

Japan

Sweden

Coach: Guy Dinwoodie

Pool B

England
Head Coach: Steve Dowling
Coach: Carol Isherwood

Scotland

Russia

Pool C

France

Ireland

Scottish Students

Pool D

Canada
 Coach: Ian Humphreys
 Assistant coach: John O'Hanley
Manager: Rab Murray

Kazakhstan

Wales

References

Squads
1994